Wymbritseradeel (official ) was a rural municipality in the Dutch province of Friesland from 1984 until 2011.  An earlier type of municipality of the same name existed from 1500 until 1984.

History

Wymbritseradeel was formed from the division of the medieval district of Waghenbrugghe.  The grietenij of Wymbritseradeel was created in 1500 as Frisian cities became independent and several grietenij were split on the south side of the area.  The boundaries of Wymbritseradeel remained unchanged until 1984.  From 1625 until the introduction of the municipal law in 1851, the grietman of Wymbritseradeel lived in the stins of Epemastate in IJsbrechtum.

The modern municipality of Wymbritseradeel was formed as part of the municipal reorganization of Friesland in January 1984.  The previous grietenij was merged with the grietenij of IJlst, parts of Doniawerstal, and the villages Greonterp, Koufurderrige, Smallebrugge, and Wonseradeel.  The town of IJlst was the administrative seat.

In 2011, the municipality merged with the neighboring municipalities of Bolsward, Nijefurd, Sneek and Wûnseradiel to form Southwest Friesland.

Spelling
Since 1986, the official name of the municipality was the Frisian-language Wymbritseradiel. However, the Dutch name Wymbritseradeel is sometimes used as a distinction for the old municipality prior to 1984.

Towns and Villages 
The former municipality had 28 official districts:

The municipality also had the following villiages:

External links

Official website

Municipalities of the Netherlands disestablished in 2011
Former municipalities of Friesland
Súdwest-Fryslân